Gerard "Ged" Corben was the lead guitarist  of The Lime Spiders, between 1985 and 2016. The band released three studio albums. The band toured the US, UK, Europe and widely through Australia.

In 1987, he and his brother David "d" Corben (bass guitar) formed The Cruel Sea with Danny Rumour on guitar & Lucky Jim Elliott on drums. They both played with the band from its inception before Tex Perkins joined, "d" leaving in 1989. Ged stayed on until 1992, leaving to concentrate on The Lime Spiders. He appears on four studio tracks with the band on their first release “Down Below”. He still plays instrumental surf music with "The White Pointers".

Lime Spiders
Joined Lime Spiders 1985. He toured and recorded three studio albums with them, as well as a number of singles and one-off tracks, until 1992, leaving due to personal differences. He teamed up with the band again in 1996. His first recording is the single "Out Of Control". He played lead guitar on all their recordings from 1985 to date.

The Lime Spiders were heavily influenced by the 1960s psychedelic movement, especially The Nuggets recordings. In 2009, Corben's son, Tom, joined the band at age 17, replacing Richard Lawson on drums. Ged & Tom both left the band, along with bassist Tony “Chief” Bambach, after the Hoodoo Guru's Dig It Up Festival in 2013.

Classical
In 1994, he gained a Certificate in Music with Distinction from the Australian Institute of Music. He went on to study performance and solo classical guitar to degree level and graduated with distinction in 1998.

Celtic and American folk
Ged plays guitar, resonator and mandolin in The Righteous Prannies. Aust Champ & multi Golden Guitar Winner fiddle player and flatpicker Mike Kerin [Flying Emus, Slim Dusty, Anne Kirkpatrick] leads the group, bass player and producer Michael Vidale who is also a multi Golden Guitar winner [Flying Emus, Jimmy and The Boys, Don Walker, The Bushwackers]. Tinker Duffy (accordion) and Luke Robinson (percussion).

They play Celtic, Appalachian, old time, bluegrass, Americana and Western swing.

Discography

Lime Spiders

Singles
Out Of Control/Save My Soul 7" (1985)
Jessica/Sparks 7" (1987)
Jessica/Sparks/Long Way To Go 12" (1987)
My Favourite Room/Blood From A Stone 7" (1987)
My Favourite Room/Blood From A Stone/Heard Her Call My Name 12" (1987)
Just One Solution/Drip Out 7" (1987)
Weirdo Libido/Here With My Love 7" (1987)

Albums
The Cave Comes Alive (1987)
Volatile (1988)
Beethoven's Fist (1989)

References

Living people
Australian Institute of Music alumni
Year of birth missing (living people)